In statistics, a hidden Markov random field is a generalization of a hidden Markov model.  Instead of having an underlying Markov chain, hidden Markov random fields have an  underlying Markov random field.

Suppose that we observe a random variable , where .
The main difference with a hidden Markov model is that neighborhood is not defined in 1 dimension but within a network, i.e.  is allowed to have more than the two neighbors that it would have in a Markov chain. The model is formulated in such a way that given ,  are independent (conditional independence of the observable variables given the Markov random field).

In the vast majority of the related literature, the number of possible latent states is considered a user-defined constant. However, ideas from nonparametric Bayesian statistics, which allow for data-driven inference of the number of states, have been also recently investigated with success, e.g.

See also 
 Hidden Markov model
 Markov network
 Bayesian network

References 

Markov networks